Edmilton Conceição dos Santos (born 9 November 1968), known as Duda, is a former Brazilian footballer.

Duda played for Bahia in the Campeonato Brasileiro. He also had a spell with Kastoria F.C. in the Greek Alpha Ethniki.

See also
Football in Brazil
List of football clubs in Brazil

References

1968 births
Living people
Brazilian footballers
Esporte Clube Bahia players
Kastoria F.C. players
Association football forwards
Sportspeople from Salvador, Bahia